Rodney Rice (12 October 1944 – 29 August 2021) was a Northern Ireland-born journalist and broadcaster who spent the majority of his career working with national broadcaster RTÉ. He was regarded as "a pioneering journalist."

Career

Born in Whiteabbey, County Antrim, Northern Ireland, Rice studied political science at Trinity College Dublin in the Republic of Ireland. After a period working with the Belfast Telegraph, he joined RTÉ in 1968 at the age of 24, where he first reported on the television current affairs programme 7 Days. In 1972, Rice moved to radio and two years later he began presenting Here and Now, a daily mid-morning news and current affairs programme which he anchored for nine years. In 1984, he moved to Saturday View, a programme which he presented for 25 years and which developed into an arena for political debate which often featured the country's most senior politicians. Rice retired from broadcasting in 2009 but continued to support agencies who worked in the developing world such as Trócaire and Action Aid, where he served as chairman.

Death
Rice died on 29 August 2021, aged 76.

References

1944 births
2021 deaths
Radio presenters from Northern Ireland
People from County Antrim